The dusky tripletooth goby (Tridentiger obscurus) is a species of goby native to marine, fresh and brackish waters along the coasts of Korea and Japan.  This species can reach a length of  TL.  This species is of minor importance to local commercial fisheries.

References

dusky tripletooth goby
Fish of Japan
Fish of Korea
dusky tripletooth goby